The Outer Trial Bank is a circular artificial island in the Wash, East Anglia, England.  It is one of two artificial islands constructed during the 1970s for a proposed UK governmental water resources scheme.

History 

In 1972, the British government undertook a study to assess the feasibility of building a tidal barrage across half of the Wash. The idea was to capture the freshwater from the River Witham, River Welland, River Nene and Great Ouse, the four main rivers which flow into the Wash, in order to build a freshwater reservoir. The study also intended to establish potential improvements to the navigation of sea locks, provide recreational facilities and develop an area of land for a power station.

Construction of the banks 
Building work began in February 1975. The bank (known locally as "the doughnut" due to its biconcave shape) was constructed of a sand fill protected by limestone riprap.

A smaller and cruder trial bank is connected by a causeway on Terrington Marsh, Norfolk. It was constructed prior to the larger offshore version.

Conclusions 
The study, which was published in 1976 as "The Wash storage scheme", found that the trial alone proved financially unfeasible (costing £3 million), and that the freshwater was too close to the tidal estuary to ensure low salinity and minimal silt levels.  The trial was soon abandoned and the plans for the scheme permanently shelved.

Present use 
The outer bank is a nesting ground for seabirds within the national nature reserve of the Wash.  In 2008, an estimated 3,000 pairs of birds nested on the island.

References 

Artificial islands of England
Landforms of Lincolnshire
Landforms of Norfolk
Islands of England